Polikarps Vilcāns (26 January 1894 – 8 May 1969) was a Latvian and Latgalian ceramicist. One of the most renowned Latgalian ceramicists. In 1937, Vilcāns was awarded with a Gold Medal at the Paris Exhibition.

Biography
Polikarps Vilcāns was born at Dūbes village in Silajāņi Parish, Russian Empire in 1894. He learned the craft of ceramicist from his father Joahims and successfully fired his first kiln at the age of 16. After the 1917 October Revolution, Vilcāns fought against the Kolchak's army in the Eastern Front.

He and Paulāns were the first Latgalian ceramicists to create a large candlesticks with a numerous prickets that eventually became a trademark of the Latgalian ceramics. His works were exhibited in Soviet Union and abroad, in France, Germany and other countries. Other Latgalian ceramicists, such as Polikarps Čerņavskis and Antons Ušpelis cited Vilcāns as their influencer and teacher.

He was one of two Latgalian ceramicists, alongside his cousin Andrejs Paulāns who were awarded with a Gold Medal at the 1937 Paris Exhibition. In 1958, Vilcāns was recognized as the People's Artist of the Latvian SSR.

Vilcāns died on 8 May 1969. He is buried in the Antonišķi cemetery.

Honors
 1937: Gold Medal at the 1937 Paris Exhibition
 1958: People's Artist of the Latvian SSR

References

External links 

 Works by Vilcāns @ Latgale Culture History Museum

1894 births
1969 deaths
People from Preiļi Municipality
20th-century Latgalian ceramists
20th-century Latvian ceramists